The 1966–67 Western Kentucky Hilltoppers men's basketball team represented Western Kentucky University during the 1966-67 NCAA University Division Basketball season. The Hilltoppers were led by coach John Oldham and consensus All-American player Clem Haskins.  WKU won the Ohio Valley Conference tournament and season championship, as well as the conference's automatic bid to the 1967 NCAA University Division basketball tournament, where they lost to the eventual runner-up, Dayton, in overtime.  The conference tournament was held in December and had no impact on the conference standing, the conference bid to the NCAA was awarded to the season champion.  The Hilltoppers had the misfortune of  having their star player, Haskins, break his wrist during the February 6th game against Murray State.  He missed the next 5 games but returned to finish the season playing in a cast, which limited his effectiveness.

Haskins was OVC Player of the Year and was joined on the All-Conference team by Wayne Chapman, Dwight Smith, and Greg Smith; Haskins, Chapman, and Dwight Smith were also named to the OVC Tournament team.  This team was one of the most talented in school history with several players being drafted by the NBA and ABA including Haskins, Dwight Smith, Greg Smith, Chapman, and Butch Kaufman.

Schedule

|-
!colspan=6| Regular Season

|-

 

|-
!colspan=6| 1967 NCAA University Division basketball tournament

References

Western Kentucky Hilltoppers basketball seasons
Western Kentucky
Western Kentucky
Western Kentucky Basketball, Men's
Western Kentucky Basketball, Men's